Nicolaas Phillipus Jacobus Steyn (born 2 August 1985 in Kroonstad) is a former South African rugby union player that made 140 first class appearances for the  and the  between 2006 and 2015. He usually played as an Eighth man.

Career

Youth

Free State Cheetahs

He made a total of eighteen appearances in the Vodacom Cup competition in 2006, 2007 and 2008, but failed to break into the Currie Cup side.

Griffons

He was a key member of their 2014 Currie Cup First Division-winning side. He captained the side in the final and helped the Griffons win the match 23–21 to win their first trophy for six years.

He retired from professional during the 2015 Currie Cup First Division season to accept a job offer as a quantity surveyor in Doha, Qatar. He left the Griffons as their all-time top try scorer with 56 tries, and in their top ten for all-time appearances.

Representative rugby

In 2012, he was selected for the South African Barbarians (North) team against  that toured South Africa as part of the 2012 mid-year rugby test series.

References

South African rugby union players
Living people
1985 births
Free State Cheetahs players
Griffons (rugby union) players
Rugby union flankers
Rugby union players from the Free State (province)